The Olympic Music Festival, based in Port Townsend, Washington, is a classical music event founded by Alan Iglitzin. For 32 seasons, concerts were held in a barn nestled on 55 acres of farmland in Quilcene, Washington. The 2016 season was presented at the Wheeler Theater at Fort Worden in partnership with the Centrum Foundation.

References

Classical music festivals in the United States
1984 establishments in Washington (state)
Recurring events established in 1984
Festivals in the Puget Sound region
Port Townsend, Washington
Music of Washington (state)
Performing arts in Washington (state)
Music festivals in Washington (state)